Belemnacanthus giganteus ("Gigantic arrow-spine") is a large, extinct, barrel-shaped holonematid arthrodire placoderm from Givetian-aged strata of Middle Devonian Eifel, Germany.  B. giganteus is known only from the holotype, a  portion of a median dorsal plate with a long, somewhat high, arching crest running down the median line of the exterior/dorsal side of the plate.  The plate has an ornamentation of ridges that originate from a point posterior to the preserved portion of the median dorsal plate.  Before the plate was identified as that of a holonematid, the plate of B. giganteus had been successively described as a tremendous spine of an elasmobranch, an agnathan, and lastly, the plate of an antiarch.

References

Holonematidae
Placoderms of Europe